"Fast Car" is a 1988 song by Tracy Chapman, also covered by Jonas Blue in 2015.

Fast Car or Fast Cars may also refer to:

Magazines
 Fast Car (magazine), UK-based car magazine

Music
 "Fast Car" (Namie Amuro song), from the 2009 album Past<Future
 "Fast Car" (Taio Cruz song), from the 2011 album TY.O
 "Fast Cars", song by Nazareth from Malice in Wonderland
 "Fast Cars", song by the Buzzcocks from Another Music in a Different Kitchen
 "Fast Cars", song by Bon Jovi from The Circle
 "Fast Cars", song by U2 from How to Dismantle an Atomic Bomb
 "Fast Cars", song by Cicada
 "Fast Cars", song by Pseudo Echo from Teleporter
 "Fast Cars", song by Rehab from Fixtape
 "Fast Cars", song by RZA from Birth of a Prince

See also
 List of fastest production cars
 Production car speed record